Caprella californica is a species of amphipod in the family Caprellidae. It is found in temperate Asia.

References

External links

 

Corophiidea
Articles created by Qbugbot
Crustaceans described in 1857